The 2007 World Series of Poker was the 38th annual World Series of Poker (WSOP).  Held in Las Vegas, Nevada at the Rio All Suite Hotel and Casino, the series featured 55 poker championships in several variants.  As a WSOP custom since 1976, each of the event winners receive a championship bracelet in addition to that event's prize money.  The series culminates with the $10,000 No-Limit hold'em "Main Event", which has attracted thousands of entrants since 2004.  The winner of the WSOP Main Event, who wins a multimillion-dollar prize, is considered to be the World Champion of Poker.

Most of the tournaments played at the WSOP are variants of Texas hold'em, a game where each player may use a combination of the five community cards and two hole cards to make the best hand.  Another poker variant with community cards is Omaha,  in which each player is dealt four hole cards and must use two of them in conjunction with three of the five community cards to make the best possible five-card hand.  In contrast to games with community cards, some variants, such as stud or draw, deal each player separate hands with no common cards.  Seven-card stud deals each player two hole cards, followed by four face-up cards one at a time, and then another hidden card, with betting after each round. Other games played at the 2007 tournament included Razz, H.O.R.S.E., and Deuce-to-Seven.  Prior to 2000, seven-card stud was the most common game in U.S. casinos, but today hold'em has almost totally eclipsed the once popular game.

Within each of these poker variants, a myriad of options exist.  For example, depending on the betting structure, a tournament might be described as no-limit, limit, or pot-limit. Games may include other variations on the rules governing the execution of the specific game such as shootout, eight or better, or heads up.

With 54,288 total entries and a combined prize pool of $159,796,918, the 2007 WSOP was the largest series of poker tournaments ever.  For many, winning a share of the prize pool was all that mattered, while others sought the glory associated with winning a bracelet.  This dichotomy could not have been illustrated better than a deal negotiated at the Senior Championship event. Tony Korfman wanted the money while Ernest Bennett wanted the glory.  Rather than leave their fates to chance, the two of them ensured they got what they wanted. In exchange for splitting the prize money, Korfman agreed to let Bennett win the bracelet.   After winning $8.25 million in the Main Event, Jerry Yang and his wife retired. "My winning today also means a lot to me, because I know that I can use this money to do a lot of good for other people out there," Yang said before donating over a million dollars to charity.  Upon winning his record eleventh bracelet, Phil Hellmuth said, "the bracelets have always been a really huge deal, to me more than the other guys, because I knew that they represented history."

Age and disability was another story line of the 2007 WSOP.  At 21 years and 10 days old, Steve Billirakis became the youngest person to ever win a WSOP bracelet.   At the other end of the spectrum, 94-year-old Jack Ury was the oldest person to ever participate in the Main Event.  Hal Lubarsky, a blind man, finished in 197th place at the Main Event.

Key

Results

Event 1: $5,000 World Championship Mixed hold'em Limit/No-Limit

This event kicked off the 2007 WSOP. It was a $ buy-in Mixed (alternating between limit and no-limit) Texas Hold'em tournament.

 3-day event: Friday, June 1, 2007 to Sunday, June 3, 2007
 Number of entries: 451
 Total prize pool: $
 Number of payouts: 45
 Winning hand: 
 Reference:

Event 2: $500 Casino Employees No-Limit Hold'em
This was a $ buy-in no-limit Texas Hold'em tournament reserved for casino employees that work in Nevada.

 2-day event: Friday, June 1, 2007 to Saturday, June 2, 2007
 Number of buy-ins: 1,039
 Total prize pool: $
 Number of payouts: 100
 Winning hand: 
 Reference:

Event 3: $1,500 No-Limit Hold’em

 3-day event: Saturday, June 2, 2007 to Monday, June 4, 2007
 Number of entries: 2,998
 Total Prizepool: $
 Number of payouts: 270
 Winning hand: 
 Reference:
 

Event 3 was the largest non-Main Event live tournament in history.  This record, however, would be short lived as event 49 would break that record.

Event 4: $1,500 Pot-Limit Hold'em

 3-day event: Sunday, June 3, 2007 to Tuesday, June 5, 2007
 Number of buy-ins: 781
 Total prize pool:  $ 
 Number of payouts:  72
 Winning hand: 
 Reference:

Event 5: $2,500 Omaha/Seven-Card Stud Hi-Low-8 or Better

 3-day event: Sunday, June 3, 2007 to Tuesday, June 5, 2007
 Number of buy-ins: 327
 Total prize pool: $
 Number of payouts: 32
 Winning hand: See note
 Reference:

Note: While seven cards were dealt, only five cards are used to determine the Winning hand.  The five cards used to determine the Winning hand were the three aces and two fours, one of the cards not used was not recorded.

Event 6: $1,500 Limit Hold'em

 3-day event: Monday, June 4, 2007 to Wednesday, June 6, 2007
 Number of buy-ins: 910
 Total prize pool:  $
 Number of payouts:  90
 Winning hand: 
 Reference:

Event 7: $5,000 Pot-Limit Omaha with rebuys

 3-day event: Monday, June 4, 2007 to Wednesday, June 7, 2007
 Number of buy-ins: 145 
 Number of rebuys: 450
 Total prize pool: $
 Number of payouts: 18
 Winning hand: 
 Reference:

Event 8: $1,000 No-Limit Hold'em with rebuys

 3-day event: Tuesday, June 5, 2007 to Thursday, June 7, 2007
 Number of buy-ins: 814
 Number of rebuys:  1,814
 Total prize pool: $
 Number of payouts: 81
 Winning hand: 
 Reference:

Event 9: $1,500 Omaha Hi-Low Split-8 or Better

 3-day event: Tuesday, June 5, 2007 to Thursday, June 7, 2007
 Number of buy-ins: 690
 Total prize pool: $
 Number of payouts: 63
 Winning hand: 
 Reference:

Ninth-place finisher Richard Ashby was eliminated simultaneously along with Ron Ware (10th place) on the final hand of day, 2 by Jordan Morgan.  Therefore, he never appeared at the official final table.

Event 10: $2,000 No-Limit Hold'em

 3-day event: Wednesday, June 6, 2007 to Friday, June 8, 2007
 Number of buy-ins: 1,531
 Total prize pool: $
 Number of payouts: 153
 Winning hand: 
 Reference:

Event 11: $5,000 World Championship Seven-Card Stud

 3-day event: Wednesday, June 6, 2007 to Friday, June 8, 2007
 Number of buy-ins: 180
 Total prize pool: $
 Number of payouts:  24
 Winning hand:  
 Reference:

Event 12: $1,500 No-Limit Hold'em (6-handed)
This event was played in a shorthanded format, no more than six players per table, with no more than six players occupying a table at any time during the tournament.
 3-day event: Thursday, June 7, 2007 to Saturday, June 9, 2007
 Number of buy-ins: 1,427
 Total prize pool: $
 Number of payouts: 120
 Winning hand:  
 Reference:

Event 13: $5,000 World Championship Pot-Limit Hold'em

 3-day event: Friday, June 8, 2007 to Sunday, June 10, 2007
 Number of buy-ins: 398
 Total prize pool: $
 Number of payouts: 36
 Winning hand: 
 Reference:

Event 14: $1,500 Seven-Card Stud

 2-day event: Friday, June 8, 2007 to Saturday, June 9, 2007
 Number of buy-ins: 395
 Total prize pool: $
 Number of payouts: 40
 Winning hand: 
 Reference:

Event 15: $1,500 No-Limit Hold'em

 3-day event: Saturday, June 9, 2007 to Monday, June 11, 2007
 Number of buy-ins: 2,628
 Total prize pool: $
 Number of payouts: 270
 Winning hand: 
 Reference:

Phil Hellmuth won his eleventh WSOP bracelet, the most of any player. He was previously one of three players with ten bracelets the others being Johnny Chan and Doyle Brunson.

Event 16: $2,500 H.O.R.S.E.

 3-day event: Saturday, June 9, 2007 to Monday, June 11, 2007
 Number of buy-ins: 382
 Total prize pool: $
 Number of payouts: 40
 Winning hand: 6-4-3-2-A-(4-3) (Razz) (card suits do not matter in Razz)
 Reference:

Razz is a form of stud poker that is normally played for ace-to-five low (lowball poker).  The object of Razz is to make the lowest five-card possible hand from the seven cards you are dealt.  In Razz, straights and flushes do not count against you for low, and the ace always plays low.  The best possible Razz hand is 5-4-3-2-A, or 5 high, also known as "the wheel" or "the bicycle". Deuce-to-seven Razz is also sometimes played.

Event 17: $1,000 World Championship Ladies No-Limit Hold'em

 3-day event: Sunday, June 10, 2007 to Tuesday, June 12, 2007
 Number of buy-ins: 1,286
 Total prize pool:  $
 Number of payouts:  99
 Winning hand: 
 Reference:

The 1,286 entrants made this the largest ladies only tournament ever.

Event 18: $5,000 World Championship Limit Hold'em

 3-day event: Sunday, June 10, 2007 to Tuesday, June 12, 2007
 Number of buy-ins: 257
 Total prize pool:  $
 Number of payouts:  27
 Winning hand: 
 Reference:

Like David Williams, Gabriel Nassif was first known for competing  Magic: The Gathering Pro Tour.

Event 19: $2,500 No-Limit Hold'em

 3-day event: Monday, June 11, 2007 to Wednesday, June 13, 2007
 Number of buy-ins: 1,013
 Total prize pool:  $
 Number of payouts:  99
 Winning hand: 
 Reference:

Event 20: $2,000 Seven-Card Stud Hi-Low Split-8 or Better

 3-day event: Monday, June 11, 2007 to Wednesday, June 13, 2007
 Number of buy-ins: 340
 Total prize pool:  $
 Number of payouts:  32
 Winning hand: 
 Reference:

Event 21: $1,500 No-Limit Hold'em Shootout

 2-day event: Tuesday, June 12, 2007 to Wednesday, June 13, 2007
 Number of buy-ins: 900
 Total prize pool:  $
 Number of payouts:  90
 Winning hand: 
 Reference:

Event 22: $5,000 No-Limit Hold'em

 3-day event: Wednesday, June 13, 2007 to Friday, June 15, 2007
 Number of buy-ins: 640
 Total prize pool:  $
 Number of payouts:  63
 Winning hand: 
 Reference:

Event 23: $1,500 Pot-Limit Omaha

 2-day event: Thursday, June 14, 2007 to Friday, June 15, 2007
 Number of buy-ins: 576
 Total prize pool:  $
 Number of payouts:  54
 Winning hand: 
 Reference:

Event 24: $3,000 World Championship Seven-Card Stud Hi/Lo Split 8 or Better

 3-day event: Thursday, June 14, 2007 to Saturday, June 16, 2007
 Number of buy-ins: 236
 Total prize pool:  $
 Number of payouts:  24
 Winning hand: K-Q-10-7-3-J-A
 Reference:

Event 25: $2,000 No-Limit Hold'em

 3-day event: Friday, June 15, 2007 to Sunday, June 17, 2007
 Number of buy-ins: 1,619
 Total prize pool:  $
 Number of payouts:  153
 Winning hand: 
 Reference:

Event 26: $5,000 H.O.R.S.E.

 3-day event: Friday, June 15, 2007 to Sunday, June 17, 2007
 Number of buy-ins: 192
 Total prize pool:  $
 Number of payouts:  24
 Winning hand:  (Omaha Hi/Lo)
 Reference:

Event 27: $1,500 No-Limit Hold'em

 3-day event: Saturday, June 16, 2007 to Monday, June 18, 2007
 Number of buy-ins: 2,315
 Total prize pool:  $
 Number of payouts:  198
 Winning hand: 
 Reference:

Event 28: $3,000 No-Limit Hold'em

 3-day event: Sunday, June 17, 2007 to Tuesday, June 19, 2007
 Number of buy-ins: 827
 Total prize pool:  $
 Number of payouts:  81
 Winning hand: 
 Reference:

Event 29: $1,500 Razz

 3-day event: Sunday, June 17, 2007 to Tuesday, June 19, 2007
 Number of buy-ins: 341
 Total prize pool:  $
 Number of payouts:  32
 Winning hand: 8-2-9-3-5-3-4 (card suits do not matter in Razz)
 Reference:

Event 30: $2,500 No-Limit Hold'em (6-handed)

 3-day event: Monday, June 18, 2007 to Wednesday, June 20, 2007
 Number of buy-ins: 847 
 Total prize pool: $
 Number of payouts: 78
 Winning hand: 
 Reference:

Event 31: $5,000 World Championship Heads-Up No-Limit Hold'em

 3-day event: Tuesday, June 19, 2007 to Thursday, June 21, 2007
 Number of buy-ins: 392
 Total prize pool: $
 Number of payouts: 64
 Winning hand: 
 Reference:

"SF" denotes players who lost in the semifinal round of the tournament and "QF" denotes players who lost in the quarterfinal round.

Event 32: $2,000 Seven-Card Stud

 3-day event: Tuesday, June 19, 2007 to Thursday, June 21, 2007
 Number of buy-ins: 213
 Total prize pool: $
 Number of payouts: 24
 Winning hand: A-A-
 Reference:

Event 33: $1,500 Pot-Limit Omaha with rebuys

 3-day event: Wednesday, June 20, 2007 to Friday, June 22, 2007
 Number of buy-ins: 293
 Number of rebuys/addons: 880
 Total prize pool: $
 Number of payouts: 27
 Winning hand: 
 Reference:

Event 34: $3,000 Limit Hold'em

 3-day event: Wednesday, June 20, 2007 to Friday, June 22, 2007
 Number of buy-ins: 296
 Total prize pool: $
 Number of payouts: 27
 Winning hand: 
 Reference:

Event 35: $1,500 No-Limit Hold'em

 3-day event: Thursday, June 21, 2007 to Saturday, June 23, 2007
 Number of buy-ins: 2,541
 Total prize pool: $
 Number of payouts: 271
 Winning hand: 
 Reference:

Event 36: $5,000 World Championship Omaha Hi-Low Split-8 or Better

 3-day event: Thursday, June 21, 2007 to Saturday, June 23, 2007
 Number of buy-ins: 280
 Total prize pool: $
 Number of payouts: 27 
 Winning hand: 
 Reference:

Event 37: $2,000 Pot-Limit Hold'em
 3-day event: Friday, June 22, 2007 to Sunday, June 24, 2007
 Number of buy-ins: 599
 Total prize pool: $
 Number of payouts: 54
 Winning hand: 
 Reference:

Event 38: $1,500 No-Limit Hold'em

 3-day event: Saturday, June 23, 2007 to Monday, June 25, 2007
 Number of buy-ins: 2,778
 Total prize pool: $
 Number of payouts: 270
 Winning hand: 
 Reference:

Event 39: $50,000 World Championship H.O.R.S.E.

 5-day event: Sunday, June 24, 2007 to Thursday, June 28, 2007
 Number of buy-ins: 148
 Total prize pool: $
 Number of payouts: 16
 Winning hand:  (Seven Card Stud 8 or better)
 Reference:

The $7.1 million prize pool and $2.2 million prize were the largest prizes in poker history for a non-Main WSOP event.

Event 40: $1,500 Mixed Hold'em Limit/No-Limit

 3-day event: Sunday, June 24, 2007 to Tuesday, June 26, 2007
 Number of buy-ins: 620
 Total prize pool: $
 Number of payouts: 63
 Winning hand: 
 Reference:

Event 41: $1,000 World Championship Seniors No-Limit Hold'em

 3-day event: Monday, June 25, 2007 to Wednesday, June 27, 2007
 Number of buy-ins: 1,882
 Total prize pool: $
 Number of payouts: 153
 Reference:

Bennett and Korfman made a deal before heads-up play began. Korfman agreed to let Bennett win the title uncontested if Bennett agreed to split the prize money.  They split the cash evenly with each taking home roughly $293,000.  With 1,882 entrants over the age of 55, this was the largest Senior's event ever.

Event 42: $1,500 Pot-Limit Omaha Hi-Low Split-8 or Better
 3-day event: Monday, June 25, 2007 to Wednesday, June 27, 2007
 Number of buy-ins: 687
 Total prize pool: $
 Number of payouts: 63
 Winning hand: 
 Reference:

Event 43: $2,000 Limit Hold'em

 3-day event: Tuesday, June 26, 2007 to Thursday, June 28, 2007
 Number of buy-ins: 472
 Total prize pool: $
 Number of payouts: 45
 Winning hand: 
 Reference:

Event 44: $2,000 Omaha Hi-Low Split-8 or Better

 3-day event: Wednesday, June 27, 2007 to Friday, June 29, 2007
 Number of buy-ins: 534
 Total prize pool: $
 Number of payouts: 54
 Winning hand: 
 Reference:

Event 45: $5,000 No-Limit Hold'em (6-handed)

 3-day event: Thursday, June 28, 2007 to Saturday, June 30, 2007
 Number of buy-ins: 728
 Total prize pool: $
 Number of payouts: 78
 Winning hand: 
 Reference:

Event 46: $1,000 Seven-Card Stud Hi-Low Split-8 or Better

 3-day event: Thursday, June 28, 2007 to Saturday, June 30, 2007
 Number of buy-ins: 668
 Total prize pool: $
 Number of payouts: 64
 Winning hand: 
 Reference:

Event 47: $2,000 No-Limit Hold'em

 3-day event: Friday, June 29, 2007 to Sunday, July 1, 2007
 Number of buy-ins: 2,038
 Total prize pool: $
 Number of payouts: 198
 Winning hand: 
 Reference:

Event 48: $1,000 Deuce to Seven Triple Draw Lowball with rebuys

 3-day event: Friday, June 29, 2007 to Sunday, July 1, 2007
 Number of buy-ins: 209
 Number of rebuys/addons: 546
 Total prize pool: $
 Number of payouts: 24
 Winning hand: 7-6-4-3-2
 Reference:

Event 49: $1,500 No-Limit Hold'em
 3-day event: Saturday, June 30, 2007 to Monday, July 2, 2007
 Number of buy-ins: 3,151
 Total prize pool: $
 Number of payouts: 324
 Winning hand: 
 Reference:

This event set a World Series of Poker non-main event and live poker attendance record with 3,151 entries breaking the previous record of 2,998 set earlier in the third event of the 2007 WSOP.  At the time it was also the third-highest entry total in all live Poker events behind just the 2006 and 2005 main events which had 8,773 and 5,619 entrants respectively.

Event 50: $10,000 World Championship Pot-Limit Omaha

 3-day event: Sunday, July 1, 2007 to Tuesday, July 3, 2007
 Number of buy-ins: 314
 Total prize pool: $
 Number of payouts: 36
 Winning hand: 
 Reference:

Event 51: $1,000 S.H.O.E.

 3-day event: Sunday, July 1, 2007 to Tuesday, July 3, 2007
 Number of buy-ins: 730
 Total prize pool: $
 Number of payouts: 72
 Winning hand: 
 Reference:

Event 52: $1,000 No-Limit Hold'em with rebuys

 3-day event: Monday, July 2, 2007 to Wednesday, July 4, 2007
 Number of buy-ins: 1,048  
 Number of rebuys/addons: 2,336
 Total prize pool: $
 Number of payouts: 100
 Winning hand: 
 Reference:

Event 53: $1,500 Limit Hold'em Shootout

 2-day event: Tuesday, July 3, 2007 to Wednesday, July 4, 2007
 Number of buy-ins: 720
 Total prize pool: $
 Number of payouts: 72
 Winning hand: 
 Reference:

Event 54: $5,000 World Championship No-Limit Deuce to Seven Draw Lowball with rebuys

 2-day event: Wednesday, July 4, 2007 to Thursday, July 5, 2007
 Number of buy-ins: 78
 Number of rebuys/addons: 226
 Total prize pool: $
 Number of payouts: 7
 Winning hand: 8-7-6-5-3
 Reference:

Event 55: $10,000 World Championship No-Limit Hold'em

As the final event, in which the "World Champion of Poker" is crowned, this is considered the "Main Event".
 12-day event: Friday, July 6, 2007 to Tuesday, July 17, 2007
 Number of buy-ins: 6,358 
 Total prize pool: $
 Number of payouts: 621
 Winning hand: 
 Reference:

References

World Series of Poker
2007 in poker